KYSR (98.7 FM) is a commercial alternative rock radio station licensed to Los Angeles, California, serving the Greater Los Angeles area. Owned by iHeartMedia, Inc., KYSR is the flagship station of syndicated morning drive program The Woody Show. The KYSR studios are located in Burbank, while the station transmitter resides in the Santa Monica Mountains on Briarcrest Peak in Beverly Hills. In addition to a standard analog transmission, KYSR broadcasts over two HD Radio channels, and is available online via iHeartRadio; KYSR also extends its signal by using a single full-power repeater: KSRY (103.1 FM) in Tehachapi.

History

Early years (1948-1970)
This station was built and signed on as KMGM, owned by Metro-Goldwyn-Mayer, on May 27, 1948. KMGM suspended operations in 1953, and the film studio sold KMGM's studio and transmitter to Art and Jean Crawford, who relaunched operations on June 30, 1954 as KCBH. The couple owned Crawford's of Beverly Hills Record & Hi-Fi Store, and used their store's inventory as a record library for the station.

KJOI (1970-1990) 
In October 1970, the station became "K-Joy" KJOI, and played beautiful music for nearly two decades. In 1976, KJOI was acquired by Command Communications.

By 1989, KJOI began playing fewer instrumental cover versions of popular songs and added more vocalists to the playlist, eschewing middle of the road songs in favor of soft adult contemporary. Instrumentals were dropped altogether in November 1989, when the station became known as "Touch 98.7," positioned between Smooth Jazz-formatted KTWV and Soft AC-formatted KOST.

KXEZ (1990-1992) 
On February 12, 1990, the call letters were changed to KXEZ, with the format altered to "Easy Oldies."

KYSR (1992-present)

Star 98.7 (1992-2007)
On August 21, 1992, KXEZ became "Star 98.7", KYSR. In the beginning, KYSR aired an adult contemporary music format, which by 1993 evolved into hot adult contemporary; also in 1993, Viacom acquired the station for $40 million. MTV VJ Mark Goodman was heard on KYSR from 1996 to 1997; no official reason for his departure was given, but his father died shortly before his departure. Ryan Seacrest co-hosted KYSR's afternoon drive program with Lisa Foxx from 1995 to 2003; both hosts were among the top rated afternoon drive shows in Los Angeles for 7 years.

By mid-1995, KYSR adjusted its format by dropping most of the rhythmic and soft rock tunes, shifting to a pop-leaning modern rock direction, minus the harder approach embraced by the more mainstream alternative KROQ. This version of Hot AC was called "modern adult contemporary", and became one of the first stations in the U.S. with the format. Viacom sold their radio assets to Chancellor Media in 1997.  The company was renamed AMFM Inc., after Chancellor merged with Capstar in 1999.  In 2000, AMFM Inc. merged with its current owner, Clear Channel Communications, now known as iHeartMedia.  Coincidentally, around this time, Viacom became the owners of KROQ when that station's parent company, CBS, merged with Viacom.

Jamie, Frosty & Frank were hired as hosts for KYSR's morning drive program in 1998; Frosty Stilwell and Frank Kramer were fired on September 15, 1999, and Jamie White was paired with Danny Bonaduce. Bonaduce departed on July 1, 2005; his vacancy was filled by board-op Jack Heine and producer Mike "Stench" Roberts.

Starting in 2002, KYSR began to experience a drop in its ratings due to a combination of factors, including the decline of hit music product in the modern adult contemporary genre, compounded later on by KCBS-FM's switch to an adult hits format. In September 2005, KYSR adjusted its playlist to focus on 1980s and 1990s hot adult contemporary music, supervised by sister station KHHT program director Mike Marino.

By April 2006, KYSR moved back to a modern adult contemporary music format with the tag line of "Today's Music Alternative." In addition, all on air personalities, including the morning show Jamie, Jack, and Stench, were temporarily pulled off the station; fans of the morning show were upset by this move, which included a public protest outside the station. Shortly afterwards, a poll was offered on the KYSR website asking if the listeners wanted Jamie, Jack and Stench to return. Ninety-seven percent said yes, and a week later, they returned to the air.  However, Jamie, Jack and Stench were replaced a year later by the morning team of Sean Valentine and Lisa Foxx in 2007.

98-7 FM (2007-2013)
On September 20, 2007, KYSR re-positioned itself as "98-7 FM," officially dropping the "Star" branding after 15 years.  The station moved to a standard Alternative format, aimed more at young men, rather than Modern AC, aimed more at young women. While KYSR still reported to broadcasting trade publications as Modern AC, its musical lean favored Modern Rock/Alternative hits with an updated library of alternative titles from the 1980s, 90s and early 2000s, including Nirvana, Green Day, Red Hot Chili Peppers, Pearl Jam, Third Eye Blind and R.E.M. In addition, KYSR played more new modern rock hits from bands such as The Killers, Foo Fighters, Incubus and Linkin Park.  This repositioning came three days after sister station KBIG dropped many dance and disco hits, and rebranded as "104.3 MYfm." Effective September 24, 2007, Sean Valentine moved over to the KBIG morning show, replacing Charlie Tuna, whose last show was September 17.

KYSR changed positioning from Modern AC to Alternative in 2008 to compete with KROQ; while the core artists largely remained the same and leaned more in a pop direction than most alternative rock stations, the station's imaging was changed, along with a new logo holding the numbers 98 and 7 in Gothic typeface with a metallic star between the numerals. Both R&R/Nielsen BDS and Mediabase concurrently added KYSR as an alternative/modern rock reporter.

Alt 98-7 (2013-present) 
On August 9, 2013, the station rebranded as "ALT 98-7," with no other change to the format.

The Woody Show began airing in mornings on April 21, 2014, reuniting "Woody" Fife, Renae Ravey, Greg Gory and Jason "Menace" McMurry, who had all last worked together at KITS, an alternative rock station in San Francisco. The show proved so popular that the show began national syndication through Premiere Networks in 2016.

"Damn Julianne" Miller was both a phone screener for The Woody Show and a weekend host on KYSR; she was one of several hundred employees fired by iHeart—along with evening host Jake Dill—on January 20, 2020.

On March 9, 2020, iHeart announced that KYSR will be affiliated with the National Football League's Los Angeles Chargers as the team's new flagship station beginning with the 2020 season. In addition to airing games, KYSR will also run contests and sweepstakes, with prizes including game tickets and official merchandise. The partnership will expand to events organized by sister station KIIS-FM beginning with its 2020 Jingle Ball.

In October 2020, afternoon DJ Andrew Harms left the station. He would be replaced by Chris Booker and Ted Stryker, who previously worked at rival station KROQ.

HD Radio
KYSR-HD2 formerly broadcast an adult alternative format called "eRockster," a national online music and social networking portal, syndicated FM radio show and HD side channel radio station that offered listeners the opportunity to participate in building and programming the radio station, and later an active rock station titled Rock Nation; KYSR-HD2 currently simulcasts  sports radio KLAC.

Past Personalities

Nighttime personality Skip Kelly was heard from 2002 until May 2004.
Richard Blade, previously on KROQ-FM, was hired by KYSR in 2003 but was later fired and replaced by Summer James.
Josh Venable, formerly late-nights/music director at KDGE in Dallas, took over afternoon drive January 2008.
On June 1, 2008, Marco Collins, formerly afternoon drive at XETRA-FM San Diego 91X, became the new midday DJ for Alternative KYSR.
On October 16, 2008, rock band Ozomatli exited as the morning show because of low ratings and conflicts with their concert tour.
On July 6, 2009, Kennedy joined "Music in the Mornings."Rog Martin Show" KCBH-FM, 1967–69, 98.7 FM.

References

External links

List of "grandfathered" FM radio stations in the U.S.

1948 establishments in California
Modern rock radio stations in the United States
National Football League on the radio
Radio stations established in 1948
YSR
IHeartMedia radio stations